Ethnofiction refers to a subfield of ethnography which produces works that introduces art, in the form of storytelling, "thick descriptions and conversational narratives", and even first-person autobiographical accounts, into peer-reviewed academic works.

In addition to written texts, the term has also been used in the context of filmmaking, where it refers to ethnographic docufiction, a blend of documentary and fictional film in the area of visual anthropology. It is a film type in which, by means of fictional  narrative or creative imagination, often improvising, the portrayed characters (natives) play their own roles as members of an ethnic or social group.

Jean Rouch is considered to be the father of ethnofiction. An ethnologist, he discovered that a filmmaker interferes with the event he registers. His camera is never a candid camera. The behavior of the portrayed individuals, the natives, will be affected by its presence. Contrary to the principles of Marcel Griaule, his mentor,  for Rouch a non-participating camera registering "pure" events in ethnographic research (like filming a ritual  without interfering with it) is a preconception denied by practice.

An ethnographer cameraman, in this view, will be accepted as a natural partner by the actors who play their roles. The cameraman will be one of them, and may even be possessed by the rhythm of dancers during a ritual celebration and induced in a state of cine-trance. Going further than his predecessors, Jean Rouch introduces the actor as a tool in research.

A new genre was born. Robert Flaherty, a main reference for Rouch, may be seen as the grandfather of this genre, although he was a pure documentary maker and not an ethnographer.

Being mainly used to refer to ethnographic films as an object of visual anthropology, the term ethnofiction is as well adequate to refer to experimental documentaries preceding and following Rouch's oeuvre and to any fictional creation in human communication, arts or literature, having an ethnographic or social background.

History
Parallel to those of Flaherty or Rouch, ethnic portraits of hard local realities are often drawn in Portuguese films since the thirties, with particular incidence from the sixties to the eighties,  and again in the early 21st century. The remote Trás-os-Montes region (see: Trás-os-Montes e Alto Douro Province in Portugal), Guinea-Bissau or the Cape Verde islands (ancient Portuguese colonies), which step in the limelights from the eighties on thanks to the work of certain directors (Flora Gomes, Pedro Costa, or Daniel E. Thorbecke, the unknown author of Terra Longe) are themes for pioneering films of this genre, important landmarks in film history.
Arousing fiction in the heart of ethnicity is something current in the Portuguese popular narrative (oral literature): in other words, the traditional attraction for legend and surrealistic imagery in popular arts inspires certain Portuguese films to strip off realistic predicates and become poetical fiction. This practice is common to many fictional films by Manoel de Oliveira and João César Monteiro and to several docufiction hybrids by António Campos, António Reis and others. Since the 1960s, ethnofiction (local real life and fantasy in one) is a distinctive mark of Portuguese cinema.

Chronology

1910s

  1914 – In the Land of the Head Hunters by Edward S. Curtis, Canada

1920s

  1926 – Moana by Robert Flaherty, US

1930s

 1930 – Maria do Mar by José Leitão de Barros, Portugal
 1931 – Tabu written by Robert Flaherty and directed by F. W. Murnau, US
 1932 – L'or des mers by Jean Epstein, France
 1933 – Las Hurdes: Tierra Sin Pan by Luis Buñuel, Spain
 1934 – Man of Aran by Robert Flaherty, UK

1940s

 1942 – Ala-Arriba! by  José Leitão de Barros, Portugal
 1948 – Louisiana Story by Robert Flaherty, US

1950s
 1955 – Les maîtres fous (The Mad Masters)  by Jean Rouch, France
 1958 – Moi, un noir (Me a Black) by Jean Rouch, France

1960s

 1961 – La pyramide humaine by Jean Rouch, France
 1962 – Acto da Primavera (Act of Spring) by Manoel de Oliveira, Portugal
 1963 – Pour la suite du monde (Of Whales, the Moon and Men) by Pierre Perrault and Michel Brault, Canada
 1967 – Jaguar, by Jean Rouch, France

1970s

 1976 – People from Praia da Vieira (Gente da Praia da Vieira) by António Campos, Portugal
 1976 – Trás-os-Montes by António Reis and Margarida Cordeiro, Portugal

1980s

 1982 – Nelisita: narrativas nyaneka by Ruy Duarte de Carvalho, Angola
 1988 – Mortu Nega (Death Denied) by Flora Gomes, Guiné-Bissau

1990s

 1997 – Ossos by Pedro Costa, Portugal

2000s

 2000 – No Quarto da Vanda  (In Vanda's Room) by Pedro Costa, Portugal
 2003 – Terra Longe (Remote Land) by Daniel E. Thorbecke
 2006 – Colossal Youth by Pedro Costa, Portugal
 2007 – Transfiction by Johannes Sjöberg

2010s

 2011 – Toomelah by Ivan Sen
 2012 – The Act of Killing by Joshua Oppenheimer, Indonesia
 2014 – Cavalo Dinheiro (Horse Money) by Pedro Costa, Portugal
 2014 – La creazione di significato (The Creation of Meaning) by Simone Rapisarda Casanova, Italy
 2015 – Dead Slow Ahead by Mauro Herce
 2018 – Zanj Hegel la (Hegel's Angel) by Simone Rapisarda Casanova, Haiti
 2018 – The Dead and the Others by João Salaviza, Portugal
 2019 – Vitalina Varela by Pedro Costa, Portugal
 2019 – Work, or To Whom Does the World Belong, by Elisa Cepedal, Spain

See also
 Direct cinema
 Docufiction
 Ethnographic film
 Ethnography
 Media ecology
 Visual anthropology

Footnotes

External links
 Ethnofition at The University of Manchester (watch video)
 Ethnofiction and Beyond: The Legacy of Projective Improvisation in Ethnographic Filmmaking by Johannes Sjöberg 
 L'ETHNOFICTION A L'ŒUVRE: prisme et images de l'entité dogon – Article (French) by Gaetano Ciarcia at Université Montpellier III
 Rouch & Cie. – un quintette  – Article (French) by Andrea Paganini at École des Hautes Études en Sciences Sociales
 Ethnic Portraits and Ethnofiction at Mubi
 The war of dreams: exercises in ethno-fiction  by Marc Augé (google books)
 Ethnofiction : drama as a creative research practice in ethnographic film at Mendley – Paper by Bloom, Elizabeth A., Ed.D., STATE UNIVERSITY OF NEW YORK  AT BINGHAMTON, 2006
 Language description and "the new paradigm": What linguists may learn from ethnocinematographers – Article by Gerrit J. Dimmendaal, University of Cologne, at University of Hawai'i at Manoa
 Ethnofiction and the Work of Jean Rouch at  UK Visual Anthropology
 

Ethnography
Visual anthropology
Anthropology documentary films
Film genres
Cinematic techniques
Drama genres
Documentary film genres
 
Fiction by genre
Fiction forms
Television genres